Eddie Cook (born December 21, 1966 in St. Louis, USA ) is a former American boxer.

Boxing career 

Cook turned professional in 1990 and won 15 consecutive fights before tasting defeat for the first time against Filipino fighter Dadoy Andujar. On March 15, 1992, he boxed against Israel Contreras for the WBA world title and won by Knockout in the 5th round. He lost the belt in his first title defense in October of the same year to Jorge Eliecer Julio on points. He retired In 1994 after losing to future hall of famer Marco Antonio Barrera.

See also
List of bantamweight boxing champions

External links

1966 births
Living people
Boxers from St. Louis
Bantamweight boxers
Super-bantamweight boxers
World bantamweight boxing champions
World Boxing Association champions
American male boxers